Joel Benjamin Goonan (born 2 September 1989 in Manchester) is an English actor, best known for his role as the villainous Gaz Bennett in Hollyoaks.

Goonan had guest roles in Waterloo Road, Doctors and Casualty. Joel Goonan left Hollyoaks in August 2010 and returned in early January 2011.

References

External links

1989 births
Living people
Male actors from Manchester
English male television actors